Aleksandr Kudashev (born 5 December 1995) is a Russian swimmer. He competed in the 2020 Summer Olympics. He was provisionally suspended by FINA for doping but was reinstated by CAS in time for his participation in the Games.

References

1995 births
Living people
Sportspeople from Samara, Russia
Swimmers at the 2020 Summer Olympics
Russian male swimmers
Olympic swimmers of Russia
Universiade medalists in swimming
20th-century Russian people
21st-century Russian people
Universiade gold medalists for Russia
Universiade silver medalists for Russia
Universiade bronze medalists for Russia
Medalists at the 2017 Summer Universiade
Medalists at the 2019 Summer Universiade